The 2006 A-League Pre-Season Challenge Cup was a series in the Australian A-League football competition held in July and August in the lead up to the start of the main season.  The opening round was 15 July 2006. The competition featured a group stage, with three regular rounds and a bonus round, followed by a two-week finals playoff.  The bonus group round matched up teams against opponents from the other group, and also offered the incentive of "bonus points" based on goals scored (1 point for 2 goals, 2 points for 3 goals, 3 points for 4 or more goals).

The Pre-Season Cup was used to enhance the A-League's profiles by playing pre-season games in regional centres including the Gold Coast, Sunshine Coast, Toowoomba, Launceston, Canberra, Wollongong, Port Macquarie, Orange and Tamworth.

Group stage

Group A

Group B

Bonus round

Knockout stage

Bracket

Playoffs

Seventh place play-off

Fifth place play-off

Third place play-off

Final

Attendances

Top goalscorers
3 goals:
 Carl Veart (Adelaide United)
 Danny Allsopp (Melbourne Victory FC)
 Alex Brosque (Sydney FC)
 Sasho Petrovski (Sydney FC)

2 goals:
 Adam Kwasnik (Central Coast Mariners)
 Paul O'Grady (Central Coast Mariners)
 Stewart Petrie (Central Coast Mariners)
 Archie Thompson (Melbourne Victory FC)
 Stuart Young (Perth Glory)

1 goal:

 Travis Dodd (Adelaide United)
 Kristian Rees (Adelaide United)
 Andre Gumprecht (Central Coast Mariners)
 Noel Spencer (Central Coast Mariners)
 Kevin Muscat (Melbourne Victory FC)
 Darren Bazeley (New Zealand Knights)
 Jonti Richter (New Zealand Knights)
 Dani Rodrigues (New Zealand Knights)
 Mark Bridge (Newcastle Jets FC
 Nicky Carle (Newcastle Jets FC)
 Vaughan Coveny (Newcastle Jets FC)
 Jade North (Newcastle Jets FC)
 Leo Bertos (Perth Glory)
 Spase Dilevski (Queensland Roar)
 Reinaldo (Queensland Roar)
 Tim Smits (Queensland Roar)
 Dario Vidosic (Queensland Roar)
 David Carney (Sydney FC)
 Robbie Middleby (Sydney FC)
 Mark Rudan (Sydney FC)
 Nikolai Topor-Stanley (Sydney FC)

References

A-League Pre-Season Challenge Cup
Challenge Cup, 2006